The Maui Marathon is a marathon located in Maui, Hawaii. As of 2022 it is now held in April, in the past it was held in the fall.

Established in 1971, the event is notable as one of the oldest marathon races in the United States. It is the second most prestigious marathon event in the state of Hawaii behind only the Honolulu Marathon.

It is the longest recurring running event in the state of Hawaii.

The award-winning course was recognized by Runner's World as one of the Top 10 Most Scenic Marathons in the United States. In the Ultimate Guide to Marathons, the Maui Marathon was recognized as the #10 destination marathon in North America. 

In addition to the Marathon, competitors have the option of running in the half-marathon, 10k, 5k, or marathon-relay run events.

List of winners of the Maui Marathon

Men's

Women's

See also

 List of marathon races in North America

References

External links
 

Marathons in the United States
Recurring sporting events established in 1971
1971 establishments in Hawaii
Annual sporting events in the United States
September sporting events
Maui